Soronia is a genus of sap-feeding beetles in the family Nitidulidae. There are about 14 described species in Soronia.

Species
These 14 species belong to the genus Soronia:

 Soronia borbonica Grouvelle, 1899
 Soronia dorrigoi Kirejtshuk, 2004
 Soronia elongata Cameron, 1903
 Soronia glabra Kirejtshuk, 2004
 Soronia grisea (Linnaeus, 1758)
 Soronia guttulata (LeConte, 1863)
 Soronia hystrix Sharp, 1876
 Soronia madagascarensis Kirejtshuk, 2004
 Soronia merkli Kirejtshuk, 2005
 Soronia oblonga C.Brisout de Barneville, 1863
 Soronia optata Sharp, 1878
 Soronia punctatissima (Illiger, 1794)
 Soronia shibatai Hisamatsu & Hisamatsu, 2008
 Soronia substriata Hamilton, 1893

References

Further reading

External links

 

Nitidulidae
Articles created by Qbugbot